The Second Ministry of Ramachandran was the Council of Ministers, headed by M. G. Ramachandran, that was formed after the seventh legislative assembly election, which was held in two phases on 28th and 31st of May 1980. The results of the election were announced in June 1980, and this led to the formation of the 7th Assembly. On 9 June 1980, the Council took office.

Constitutional requirement

For the Council of Ministers to aid and advise Governor 
According to Article 163 of the Indian Constitution,

This means that the Ministers serve under the pleasure of the Governor and he/she may remove them, on the advice of the Chief Minister, whenever they want.

The Chief Minister shall be appointed by the Governor and the other Ministers shall be appointed by the Governor on the advice of the Chief Minister, and the Minister shall hold office during the pleasure of the Governor:Provided that in the States of Bihar, Madhya Pradesh and Odisha, there shall be a Minister in charge of tribal welfare who may in addition be in charge of the welfare of the Scheduled Castes and backward classes or any other work.

Cabinet ministers

References 

All India Anna Dravida Munnetra Kazhagam
Tamil Nadu ministries
1980s in Tamil Nadu
1980 establishments in Tamil Nadu
Cabinets established in 1980